The James and Caroline M. Metcalf House is a historic house in Gunnison, Utah. It was built in 1883, probably for James Metcalf, an immigrant from England who became a sheep and livestock farmer in Utah, and his Denmark-born wife Caroline, the daughter of Hans Larsen, who gave them the plot of land. However, the Metcalfs may have owned but not lived in the house. It was a hall-parlor plan house with Classical Revival-style details. It has been listed on the National Register of Historic Places since July 23, 1998.

References

		
National Register of Historic Places in Sanpete County, Utah
Neoclassical architecture in Utah
Houses completed in 1883
1883 establishments in Utah Territory